Marius Matei (born 1 February 1984) is a Romanian footballer who plays as a forward for Avântul Valea Mărului.

Statistics

Career honours

FC Vaslui 

UEFA Intertoto Cup
Winner: 2008

References

External links
 
 

1984 births
Living people
Romanian footballers
Association football forwards
Liga I players
Liga II players
AFC Dacia Unirea Brăila players
FC Vaslui players
ASC Oțelul Galați players
FC Botoșani players
FCV Farul Constanța players
FC Voluntari players
FC Brașov (1936) players
ACS Foresta Suceava players
CS Luceafărul Oradea players
Sportspeople from Galați